Kroemer or Krömer is a surname. Notable people with the surname include:

 Herbert Kroemer (born 1928), a professor of electrical and computer engineering

See also
 24751 Kroemer (1992 SS24), a main-belt asteroid discovered on 1992

German-language surnames
de:Krömer